The 131st Tank Regiment is an inactive tank regiment of the Italian Army based in Persano in Campania. Originally, the regiment, like all Italian tank units, was part of the infantry, but on 1 June 1999 it became part of the cavalry. Operationally, the regiment was last assigned to the Bersaglieri Brigade "Garibaldi".

History

World War II 

The regiment was formed by the depot of the 31st Tank Infantry Regiment in Siena on 27 July 1941 as the 131st Tank Infantry Regiment with three tank battalions formed by the 4th Tank Infantry Regiment. All three battalions were equipped with captured French tanks. The regiment was formed with the following structure:

 131st Tank Infantry Regiment
 CI Tank Battalion "R35" (captured French Renault R35 light tanks)
 CII Tank Battalion "R35" (captured French R35 light tanks)
 CC Tank Battalion "S35" (captured French SOMUA S35 tanks)

On 15 August 1941, the regiment arrived in the Friuli region and joined the 131st Armored Division "Centauro", which already fielded the 31st Tank Infantry Regiment. On 25 December 1941, the regiment ceded the CC Tank Battalion "S35" to the XIII Army Corps on Sardinia. On 2 January 1942, the regiment left the Centauro division and moved to Sicily, where the regiment's CII Tank Battalion "R35" was assigned to the XII Army Corps defending the island's West, while the regiment's headquarter with the CI Tank Battalion "R35" joined the XVI Army Corps defending the island's South.

In Sicily, the regiment's two battalions and the companies of the CXXXIII Semovente Battalion "47/32" were split into small tactical groups. When the allied invasion of Sicily began on 9 July 1943, the CII Tank Battalion "R35" was annihilated by the American 3rd Infantry Division on 21 July 1943 north of Agrigento, while remnants of the CI Tank Battalion managed to retreat to Messina and from there they were evacuated to Calabria. On 1 September 1943, the remnants of the 131st Tank Infantry Regiment arrived in Siena to be reformed, but after Italy changed sides with the Armistice of Cassibile on 8 September 1943 the 131st Tank Infantry Regiment was disbanded by the Germans.

Cold War 
On 1 January 1953, the Italian Army raised the CI Tank Battalion equipped with M26 Pershing tanks in Pinerolo as an autonomous tank battalion of the III Army Corps. In October 1956, the battalion moved to Verona as a corps asset of the IV Army Corps. The battalion was disbanded on 31 December 1963 and its personnel contributed to the rise of the III Tank Battalion for the newly raised 32nd Tank Regiment.

101st Tank Battalion "M.O. Zappalà" 

During the 1975 army reform, the 31st Tank Regiment was disbanded on 21 October 1975 and its II Tank Battalion became the 101st Tank Battalion "M.O. Zappalà", which received the flag and traditions of the 131st Tank Infantry Regiment. The battalion's number commemorated the CI Tank Battalion "R35", which had served with the 131st regiment during the allied invasion of Sicily. Tank and armored battalions created during the 1975 army reform were all named after officers, soldiers and partisans, who were posthumously awarded Italy's highest military honor the Gold Medal of Military Valour during World War II. The 101st Tank Battalion's name commemorated the commander of the LI Tank Battalion "M14/41" Lieutenant Colonel Salvatore Zappalà, who had been awarded three Silver Medals of Military Valour (2x World War I, 1x Invasion of Yugoslavia), one Bronze Medal of Military Valour (Spanish Civil War) and three War Crosses of Military Valor (Spanish Civil War, Second Italo-Ethiopian War, Greco-Italian War); the Lieutenant Colonel was also awarded posthumously a Gold Medal of Military Valour after being fatally injured on 30 June 1942 near El Dabaa in Egypt during the Axis pursuit of the British Eighth Army after the Battle of Mersa Matruh. Based in Bellinzago Novarese and equipped with Leopard 1A2 main battle tanks, the battalion joined the 31st Armored Brigade "Curtatone".

Recent times 
With the end of the Cold War, the Italian Army had drawn down its forces and on 31 July 1993, the 101st Tank Battalion "M.O. Zappalà" and its personnel entered the 1st Tank Battalion "M.O. Cracco", which was then reformed on 1 September 1993 as 31st Tank Regiment. On the same day, the 131st Tank Regiment was reformed in Persano in Southern Italy with the personnel and materiel of the 31st Tank Battalion "M.O. Andreani" of the 8th Bersaglieri Brigade "Garibaldi". On 4 October 1993 the flag of the 31st Tank Battalion "M.O. Andreani" was transferred to the Shrine of the Flags in the Vittoriano in Rome. The 131st Tank Regiment was assigned to the 8th Bersaglieri Brigade "Garibaldi". In 2008 the army's last Leopard 1A5 main battle tanks were retired and the regiment after receiving the Ariete main battle tanks. On 11 July 2013 the 131st Tank Regiment was renamed the 4th Tank Regiment and the flag of the 131st was transferred to the Shrine of the Flags in the Vittoriano in Rome.

See also 
 Bersaglieri Brigade "Garibaldi"

References

Tank Regiments of Italy
1941 establishments in Italy